Factor D (C3 proactivator convertase, properdin factor D esterase, factor D (complement), complement factor D, CFD, adipsin) is a protein which in humans is encoded by the CFD gene. Factor D is involved in the alternative complement pathway of the complement system where it cleaves factor B.

Function 

The protein encoded by this gene is a member of the trypsin family of serine proteases secreted by adipocytes into the bloodstream. The encoded protein is a component of the alternative complement pathway best known for its role in humoral suppression of infectious agents. Finally, the encoded protein has a high level of expression in fat, suggesting a role for adipose tissue in immune system biology.

Factor D is a serine protease that stimulates glucose transport for triglyceride accumulation in fats cells and inhibits lipolysis.

Clinical significance 

The level of Factor D is decreased in obese patients. This reduction may be due to high activity or resistance but exact cause is not fully known.

Structure 

All members of the chymotrypsin family of serine proteases have very similar structures.  In all cases, including factor D, there are two antiparallel β-barrel domains with each barrel containing six β-strands with the same typology in all enzymes.  The major difference in backbone structure between Factor D and the other serine proteases of the chymotrypsin family is in the surface loops connecting the secondary structural elements.  Factor D displays different conformations of major catalytic and substrate-binding residues typically found in the chrotrypsin family.  These features suggest the catalytic activity of factor D is prohibited unless conformational changes are induced by a realignment.

Mechanism of Action 

Factor D is a serine protease present in blood and tissue in an active sequence but self-inhibited conformation. The only known natural substrate of Factor D is Factor B, and cleavage of the Arg234-Lys235 scissile bond in Factor B results in two Factor B fragments, Ba and Bb. Before cleavage of the scissile bond in Factor B can occur, Factor B must first bind with C3b before to form the C3bB complex. It is proposed that this conformational change of Factor B in the C3bB complex allows Factor B to fit into the binding site of Factor D.

The catalytic triad of Factor D is composed of Asp102, His57 and Ser195. Other key components of Factor D are an Asp189-Arg218 salt bridge that stabilizes a self-inhibitory loop (amino acid residues 212 to 218) and His57 side chain in the non-canonical conformation. In its inhibited form, the self-inhibitory loop prevents access of Factor B to Factor D. When the self-inhibited conformation of Factor D is approached by the C3bB complex, C3bB displaces the salt bridge in Factor D and results in a new salt bridge between the Arg234 of Factor B and Asp189 of Factor D. The displacement of the Factor D salt bridge results in a realignment of the self-inhibitory loop and a rotation of the active site histidine side chain, creating the canonical form of Factor D. Cleavage of the scissile bond in Factor B then ensues, releasing fragment Ba and forming C3bBb, the alternative pathway C3-convertase.

Regulation 

Factor D is synthesized by the liver and adipocytes with the latter being the major source. The pro-form of Factor D that is secreted is cleaved by MASP-3 to form the active sequence that circulates in the body. Factor D maintains an extremely high substrate specificity, and as a result has no known natural inhibitors in the body. However, most of Factor D remains in the self-inhibited form that limits substrate access to the catalytic site. Factor D has a molecular weight of 23.5 kD and is present at a concentration of 1.8 mg/L of blood in healthy humans. The synthesis rate of Factor is approximately 1.33 mg/kg/day, and most of Factor D is eliminated through the kidney after catabolism in proximal tubules after re-absorption. The net effect is a high fractional metabolic rate of 60% per hour. In patients with normal kidney function, no Factor D was detectable in urine. However, in patients with renal disease, Factor D was found at elevated levels. The alternative pathway is capable of operating even at low levels of Factor D, and deficiencies in levels of Factor D are rare.

Role in Diseases 

A point mutation resulting in the replacement of a serine codon (Ser42 in the unprocessed methionine form of Factor D) with a stop codon (TAG) in the Factor D gene on chromosome 19 has been documented as a cause of Factor D deficiency. Deficiency in Factor D may cause an increased susceptibility to bacterial infections, specifically Neisseria infections. The mode of inheritance of Factor D deficiency is autosomal recessive, and individuals with a mutation on only one allele may not experience the same susceptibility to reoccurring infections. In a patient with reoccurring infections, complete improvement in the condition was obtained by introducing purified Factor D.

Diseases with excessive complement activation include paroxysmal nocturnal hemoglobinuria (PNH), and inhibitors of Factor D may have utility in the treatment of PNH. Small molecule inhibitors of Factor D are under development for the treatment of PNH, and one small molecule inhibitor, ACH-4471, has shown promise in a Phase 2 clinical trial for Factor D inhibition when combined with eculizumab. Patients treated with Factor D inhibitors must be immunized against infections in order to avoid reoccurring infections as in patients with Factor D deficiency.

References

External links
 

Complement system
EC 3.4.21